Frederick Tickell (7 March 1857 - 19 September 1919) was an Australian naval officer.

Biography 
He was born on 7 March 1857 in Amoy Harbour, China to Captain George Tickell, seaman and member of the Royal Naval Reserve and his wife Charlotte Crabbe.

He died of a cerebro-vascular disease on 19 September 1919.

Education 
He completed his primary and secondary education at the Scotch College from 1870 to 1875.

Personal life 
He married Mary Elizabeth Figg on 18 December 1886.

Career 
He became a lieutenant in 1889.

He joined the Royal Australian Navy in 1890.

He became a commander in 1897 and became commandant of the Victorian Naval Forces.

He saw combat during the Boxer Rebellion and he was Mentioned in Dispatches.

Towards the end of his career, he served as aide-de-camp to the Governor General.

See also 
Royal Australian Navy

References

External links 
Australian navy site

Australian soldiers
1857 births
1919 deaths